The Catherine Tate Show is a British comedy sketch series that premiered on 16 February 2004. It aired on BBC Two from 2004 to 2006 and on BBC One from 2007 to 2014. Three series were aired between 2004 and 2006, with two Christmas specials between 2005 and 2007 and a Comic Relief special in 2007. It went on to include specials between 2009 and 2015 in a spin-off show which featured the Nan Taylor character.

A total of 20 episodes have been aired to date, plus four specials of "Nan". The series was co-written by the show's leading character Catherine Tate.

Series overview

Episodes

Series 1 (2004)

Series 2 (2005)

Series 3 (2006)

Catherine Tate's Nan (2009–15)

Notes

References

Catherine Tate Show